Bio Ritmo "Salsa Machine" is a salsa band based in Richmond, Virginia formed in 1991. The name Bio Ritmo is a Spanglish word play on the term Biorhythm, the hypothetical description for the rhythm of life.

The eight to ten member ensemble is known for a classic Nuyorican salsa sound made famous by the Fania All Stars in the 1970s that combines African Caribbean rhythms from son, bomba, plena, and samba with electronica and big band brass.

Founded in the early 1990s, they started out as a part of the Virginia college band scene that included other, then indie, acts like Dave Matthews Band and Fighting Gravity.

In November 2004, the Salsa Machine won the Disc Makers Independent Music World Series (IMWS) Northeast finals held at The Lion's Den in New York City and earned the title of "Top Independent Act in the Northeast." They were finalists in the 2004 Independent Music Awards – Latin Category.

Following their critically acclaimed 2003 self-titled release, Bio Ritmo released its EP, Salsa System, produced by legendary engineer/producer and 18-time Grammy Award winner, Jon Fausty. In September 2008, Bio Ritmo released their LP "Bionico", recorded by Lance Koehler and mixed and mastered by Jon Fausty.

In September 2011, Bio Ritmo released their latest LP, "La Verdad" on CD and Vinyl, celebrating 20 years of original salsa music.

The band
Rei Alvarez: vocals, guiro (original member)
Giustino Riccio: timbal, coro, clave, drumset (original member)
Bob Miller: trumpet, coro, synth (original member)
Marlysse Simmons: piano, Farfisa organ, (leader)
Tobias Whitaker: trombone
Mark Ingraham: trumpet
Edward Prendergast: bass
Michael Montañez: bongó
Hector "Coco" Barez: conga
JC Kuhl: saxophone
John Lilley: saxophone
Gabo Tomasini: conga (original member)

Discography
Piraguero, 7" single, Merge Records, 1995
Que Siga la Musica, Album, Shameless Records, 1996
Salsa Galactica, Album, Permanent Records, 1997
Rumba Baby Rumba!, Album, Mercury / Triloka records, 1998
Bio Ritmo (self-titled), Album, Independent Release, Locutor Records, 2004
Salsa System, EP, Independent Release, Locutor Records, 2006
Bionico, Album, Locutor Records, 2008
Lisandra / Shoe Shine, 7" single, Locutor Records, 2009
Dina's Mambo / La Muralla, 7" single, Electric Cowbell Records, 2011
La Verdad, Album, Electric Cowbell Records, 2011
Carnaval, Digital Single, Vampisoul Records, 2014
Puerta del Sur, Album, Vampisoul Records, 2014
Oriza, 7" Single, Peace and Rhythm Records, 2015
Señor Locutor, Digital Single, 2016

Featured on international CD compilations: Latin Beat Magazine's 2005 Siempre Salsa CD of the best indie salsa; the Swiss release Ritmo Rico, and Holland's Latin Lounge Vol. 1.

Performances
Bio Ritmo has toured the United States extensively and has also performed in Canada, Puerto Rico, France, and the Republic of Georgia.

Bio Ritmo has shared the stage with Mambo King, Tito Puente, as well as Poncho Sanchez, Squirrel Nut Zippers, Timbalaye, Tambo, Ozomatli, Steel Pulse, Burning Spear, Morphine, G Love and Special Sauce, Wilco, Southern Culture on the Skids, Frankie Vazquez, La Familia Quintero, La Sonora Ponceña, Bloque 53, and Diabloson.

January 14, 2006, Bio Ritmo performed at the Inaugural Ball for Commonwealth of Virginia Governor Tim Kaine in Williamsburg, Virginia at the College of William & Mary.

August 2010 Bio Ritmo toured Republic of Georgia and performed for President Saakashvili

September 2011 Bio Ritmo performed in Dax, France at the Toros y Salsa festival.

On September 23, 2011 Bio Ritmo celebrated its 20th anniversary.

References

External links
Bio Ritmo website
Bio Ritmo on myspace
IMWS Press Release
Rock Paper Scissors Profile
2006 Virginia Governor's Inauguration

Salsa music groups
Musicians from Virginia
Salsa musicians
Musical groups established in the 1990s